William Wheeler House may refer to:

William Wheeler House (University of Massachusetts, Amherst)
William Wheeler House (Victoria, Texas)

See also
Wheeler House (disambiguation)